Strobilopsis is a genus of flowering plants belonging to the family Scrophulariaceae.

Its native range is Southern Africa.

Species
Species:
 Strobilopsis wrightii Hilliard & B.L.Burtt

References

Scrophulariaceae
Scrophulariaceae genera